The list of ship commissionings in 1991 includes a chronological list of all ships commissioned in 1991.


See also 

1991
 Ship commissionings